Abu Ubaidah al-Banshiri (May 1950 – 23 May 1996) was the nom de guerre of Ali Amin al-Rashidi (علي أمين الرشيدي), one of the "most capable and popular leaders" of al-Qaeda. 

When he drowned in a ferry accident on Lake Victoria in 1996, he was the head of al-Qaeda's African presence and second in command of the whole organization, below Osama bin Laden.

History

Al-Banshiri was born in May 1950 in Cairo, and served as a policeman in Egypt before joining the anti-Soviet effort in Afghanistan, fighting alongside Ahmed Shah Massoud.

His brother had participated in the assassination of Egyptian President Anwar El Sadat.  Ayman al-Zawahiri, head of Egyptian Islamic Jihad, introduced al-Banshiri to Osama Bin Laden, who was so favorably impressed that he made al-Banshiri military commander of the Afghan Arabs.  Al-Bashiri's second in command was Mohammed Atef. He was shot in the leg during the 1987 Battle of Jaji.

While still in Afghanistan, in August 1988, he attended the founding meeting of al-Qaeda, along with bin Laden, Mamdouh Mahmud Salim, and others.

While in Kenya and Tanzania he was known by the aliases Adel Habib, Karim, and Jalal. He married a Kenyan woman and set up a business in Nairobi importing automobiles from the United Arab Emirates.

At some point al-Banshiri acquired either Dutch citizenship or forged Dutch papers. Prior to 1996, al-Bashiri, Mohammed Atef and Yaseen al-Iraqi aided Enaam Arnaout in purchasing AK-47s and mortar rounds from a Pashtun tribesman named Hajjji Ayoub, and they were subsequently delivered in large trucks to the Jawr and Jihad Wahl training camps.

Death
When the news broke that the ferry  had sunk in Lake Victoria, al-Qaeda sent Fazul Abdullah Mohammed and Wadih el-Hage to the scene, to verify that al-Banshiri had drowned, and had not been murdered.

Al-Banshiri was succeeded as al-Qaeda's "military" commander by another Egyptian ex-policeman, Mohammed Atef, who had been considered his inseparable friend. Al-Banshiri's senior role in East Africa was taken over, at least in part, by Abdullah Ahmed Abdullah.

A poem entitled "Tears in the Eyes of Time" was written about al-Banshiri, commemorating him among the greatest of the "fallen mujahideen". Al-Zawahiri recited the poem in his January 2006 internet broadcast.

References 

1950 births
1996 deaths
Al-Qaeda founders
Al-Qaeda leaders
Islamists from Cairo
Egyptian al-Qaeda members
Deaths due to shipwreck